Chicken Creek may refer to:

Chicken Creek (South Carolina), a stream in Berkeley County
Chicken Creek (South Dakota), a stream
Chicken Creek, Utah, a ghost town